José Farías (17 April 1937 – 10 June 2004) was an Argentine football player and manager. He played and coached in France.

Farías played for Boca Juniors, Club de Gimnasia y Esgrima La Plata, Club Atlético Lanús, Los Andes, Club Atlético Huracán, RC Paris, RC Strasbourg, Red Star and Toulouse FC.

He then enjoyed a coaching career with Toulouse FC and Red Star.

He died in June 2004 in Argentina.

References

External links
Profile at racingstub
Club de Gimnasia y Esgrima La Plata history site

1937 births
2004 deaths
Sportspeople from Buenos Aires Province
Association football midfielders
Argentine footballers
Argentine expatriate footballers
Boca Juniors footballers
Club Atlético Los Andes footballers
Club de Gimnasia y Esgrima La Plata footballers
Club Atlético Lanús footballers
Club Atlético Huracán footballers
Racing Club de France Football players
RC Strasbourg Alsace players
Red Star F.C. players
Toulouse FC players
Argentine Primera División players
Ligue 1 players
Ligue 2 players
Expatriate footballers in France
Argentine football managers
Toulouse FC managers
Red Star F.C. managers
Argentine expatriate sportspeople in France